Thomas Thornton Sweenie (born 15 July 1945) is a Scottish former professional footballer who played as a midfielder in the Football League for Leicester City and York City, in non-League football for Burton Albion and Lockheed Leamington, in Scottish junior football for Johnstone Burgh, and was on the books of Arsenal and Huddersfield Town without making a league appearance.

References

1945 births
Living people
Footballers from Paisley, Renfrewshire
Scottish footballers
Association football midfielders
Johnstone Burgh F.C. players
Leicester City F.C. players
Arsenal F.C. players
Huddersfield Town A.F.C. players
York City F.C. players
Burton Albion F.C. players
Leamington F.C. players
English Football League players